Dmitry Sharifyanovich Karimov (born October 23, 1978), known as The Concrete Products Maniac, is a Russian serial rapist and serial killer, who raped 10 women from 2005 to 2006, killing 7 of them.

Biography 
Little about his early life is known. Karimov was working as a bricklayer in Yekaterinburg when he committed his first offense in 2004. He attacked his girlfriend, punching her several times, then raped and strangled her with a rope. When she lost consciousness, Karimov, thinking he had killed her, took her cell phone and threw the body under a heater. The girl appealed to the police after she woke up, but did not report the rape and attempted murder, explaining that "she just got a job, and did not need any problems with the police". Karimov was convicted of robbery and infliction of bodily injuries, and was sentenced to two years imprisonment.

The first murder he committed was in December 2005, on the territory of the Yekaterinburg Mayanovskoye Central Park of Culture. He killed a 15-year-old schoolgirl, who had just left school and was walking around the park. After killing her, Karimov took her cell phone, 700 rubles and a gold chain, as well as her ID, which he subsequently burned.

All subsequent murders Karimov committed were during the next three months. After getting acquainted with future victims, Karimov introduced himself as a tourist who asked for them to show him the sights around Yekaterinburg, or would pose as a policeman who asked them to go with him to the police station. Sometimes he attacked without warning, and thus had no consistent modus operandi. In some cases, he would stab his victims with knives (one of them had been stabbed 20 times), and in others he strangled them with his bare hands or with a rope. All six subsequent murders were committed in the area of the concrete products plant, from which he earned his nickname.

In March 2006, Karimov attacked two girls in the area of the concrete products factory. Despite the knife injuries, they managed to escape, and later identified Karimov, who was arrested on March 22, 2006. During the investigation, Karimov denied the rapes, claiming that his victims offered to have sex with him. He calmly admitted to the murders, however, and showed the crime scenes to the investigators. As a result, he confessed to seven murders and three attempted murders.

The forensic psychiatric examination diagnosed Karimov as having a "mixed-mosaic personality disorder", and, as a result, was mentally unbalanced. Despite this, he was declared sane. At the trial, Karimov did not deny any charge, kept his head bowed and never made eye contact with his victims' relatives. On March 15, 2007, Dmitry Karimov was sentenced to life imprisonment. He was also ordered to pay 500,000 rubles to the victims' families, and 50,000 rubles to the victims of the attempted murders. The Supreme Court of Russia left the verdict unchanged, and is currently being enforced. Karimov is currently serving his sentence in the White Swan prison.

See also
 List of Russian serial killers

References 

1978 births
Inmates of White Swan Prison
Living people
Male serial killers
Serial killers from Yekaterinburg
Russian murderers of children
Russian rapists